Awojobi is a surname of Yoruba origin. Notable people with the surname include:

Ayodele Awojobi (1937–1984), scholar and academic
Tunji Awojobi (born 1973), Nigerian basketball player
Oluyombo Awojobi (1951 - 2015), Nigerian rural surgeon

Yoruba-language surnames